Jean Weissenbach (born 13 February 1946) is a French biologist. He is the current director of the Genoscope. He is one of the pioneers of sequencing and genome analysis.

Publications

References

Living people
French geneticists
1946 births
Members of the French Academy of Sciences
Officiers of the Légion d'honneur
Human Genome Project scientists